Péter Kurucz (born 30 May 1988) is a retired Hungarian footballer who played as a goalkeeper.

Club career
Kurucz began his career as a youth team player for Újpest. In February 2008, he played on loan for Tatabánya, making two appearances, before returning to Újpest and signing a contract with them.

On 9 February 2009, he completed a season long loan move with a purchase option to West Ham United. Kurucz made his competitive debut for West Ham in the 2–0 Premier Reserve League South defeat to Aston Villa on 17 March 2009. Kurucz made 5 reserve-team appearances for West Ham in the 2008/09 season.

On 3 June 2009, it was announced that Kurucz had signed a four-year contract with West Ham for an undisclosed fee.

On 5 December 2009, he made his first competitive appearance for West Ham, coming on as a substitute for Robert Green at Upton Park in a 4–0 defeat to Manchester United, although he did not concede any of the goals. In August 2010, during a friendly at Burton Albion, Kurucz picked up an anterior cruciate injury that ruled him out for the 2010-11 season.

In January 2012 Kurucz signed on loan for Rochdale. In May 2012 his contract with West Ham was terminated by mutual consent. He joined Crystal Palace on trial and played in the second half in a preseason friendly match against Lewes conceding once, and the full 90 minutes away at Dulwich Hamlet a few days later, keeping a clean sheet and saving a well struck penalty.

International career
Kurucz was a member of the under-21 national team at international level with Hungary.

References

External links

West Ham Utd Profile
Premier League profile

1988 births
Living people
Footballers from Budapest
Hungarian footballers
Association football goalkeepers
Újpest FC players
FC Tatabánya players
West Ham United F.C. players
Rochdale A.F.C. players
BFC Siófok players
Ferencvárosi TC footballers
Premier League players
English Football League players
Hungarian expatriate footballers
Expatriate footballers in England
Hungarian expatriate sportspeople in England